Prithu Baskota (born 5 July 1992) is a Nepalese cricketer. All-rounder Prithu is a right-handed batsman and a right-arm off break bowler. He made his debut for Nepal against Maldives in November 2010.

He represents the APF Club of the National League and GoldenGate International College, which plays in the SPA Cup.

Playing career 

Baskota was selected as part of Nepal's fourteen man squad for the 2012 World Twenty20 Qualifier in the United Arab Emirates, making his Twenty20 debut during the tournament against Hong Kong. He made eight further appearances during the tournament, with his final appearance coming against Papua New Guinea. He scored 83 runs in his nine matches, which came at an average of 20.75, with a high score of 36 not out. With the ball, he took 2 wickets. Nepal finished the tournament in seventh place, therefore failing to qualify for the 2012 World Twenty20.

Later in 2012, he was selected as part of the Nepal Under-19s squad for the Under-19 World Cup in Australia, making six Youth One Day International appearances during the tournament. In August 2012, he was selected in Nepal's fourteen man squad for the World Cricket League Division Four in Malaysia.

He played for Upchurch Cricket Club, a cricket club in England, in Kent Cricket League Division 2 in July 2015. He scored an unbeaten 146 runs off 125 balls in a match against Gravesend Cricket Club and picked up 2 wickets. He was subsequently selected in Nepal's squad for the 2015–17 ICC World Cricket League Championship's matches against Scotland.

In January 2021, he was named in the Bagmati Province's squad for the 2021 Prime Minister Cup. He was the highest run-scorer in the tournament, securing 215 runs.

Man of the match awards

The following list illustrates all the matches in which Baskota has won the man of the match award while representing Nepal in international series/tournaments.

References

External links 
 Prithu Baskota on ESPNcricinfo
 Prithu Baskota on CricketArchive

1992 births
Living people
Nepalese cricketers
Cricketers at the 2010 Asian Games
Asian Games competitors for Nepal